Radu Albot and Artem Sitak were the defending champion, but they did not participate this year.

Dustin Brown and František Čermák won the title, defeating Andrés Molteni and Marco Trungelliti in the final, 6–1, 6–2.

Seeds

Draw

References
 Main Draw

Garden Open - Doubles
2015 Doubles
Garden